The Australian Strategic Policy Institute (ASPI) is a defence and strategic policy think tank based in Canberra, Australian Capital Territory, founded by the Australian government and funded by the Australian and overseas governments, and defence and technology companies.

History
ASPI was first established in 2001 under Prime Minister John Howard to provide "policy-relevant research and analysis to better inform Government decisions and public understanding of strategic and defence issues". ASPI was officially launched at ANZAC Hall at the Australian War Memorial on 13 March 2002 by then-Australian Minister for Defence Robert Hill.

ASPI's inaugural director was Hugh White, who served as director from 2001 to 2004. White had served as an intelligence analyst for the Office of National Assessments, as an adviser to Prime Minister Bob Hawke and Defence Minister Kim Beazley, and as the Deputy Secretary for Strategy and Intelligence at the Australian Department of Defence between 1995 and 2000. He is Emeritus Professor of Strategic Studies at the Australian National University.

White was succeeded by retired Major General Peter Abigail in April 2005. In February 2012, the Minister for Defence Stephen Smith announced the appointment of Peter Jennings PSM as ASPI's new executive director, effective in May 2012.

In August 2021 a report published by the Australian Strategic Policy Institute implicated China in campaigns of online manipulation conducted against Australia and Taiwan using influence-for-hire.

In September 2021, the Australian government announced that it would fund the establishment of an ASPI office in Washington, D.C. at a cost of $5 million for the first two years.

In May 2022, Justin Bassi, former chief of staff for Marise Payne, was appointed as Executive Director shortly before the election. The Guardian later reported that documents obtained via a Freedom of Information request showed that Defence Minister Peter Dutton overturned ASPI's council's choice of candidate to appoint Bassi, who had been a long time advisor to Liberal politicians.

Funding
The ASPI was established by the Australian Government in 2001 as a company limited by guarantee under the 2001 Corporations Act. At the time it was 100% funded by the Australian Department of Defence, but this had fallen to 43% in the 2018-19 financial year. In 2020, Myriam Robin in the Australian Financial Review identified three sources of funding, in addition to the Department of Defence. ASPI receives funding from defence contractors such as Lockheed Martin, BAE Systems, Northrop Grumman, Thales Group and Raytheon Technologies. It also receives funding from technology companies such as Microsoft, Oracle Australia, Telstra, and Google. Finally, it receives funding from foreign governments including Japan, Taiwan and the Netherlands.

For the 2019-2020 financial year, ASPI listed a revenue of $11,412,096.71. The ASPI received from the Australian Department of Defence 35% of its revenue, 32% from federal government agencies, 17% from overseas government agencies, 11% from the private sector, and 3% from the defense industries. Finally, it receives funding from foreign governments including Japan, Israel, Canada, the United States, the United Kingdom, and the Netherlands.

For the 2020-2021 financial year, of its listed revenue of $10,679,834.41, the ASPI received 37.5% from the Australian Department of Defence, 24.5% from other Australian federal agencies, and 18.3% from overseas government agencies such as those from Japan, the US, and the UK. On 5 June 2021, it also received an additional grant of $5 million from the Australian Department of Defense for establishing its Washington, D.C., office over the financial years 2021–2023.

Publications
ASPI regularly produces 5 types of publications: Strategies, Strategic Insights, Special Report, the Annuals series, and publications for its International Cyber Policy Centre.

ASPI also publishes The Strategist, a daily analysis and commentary site. The Strategist aims to "provide fresh ideas on Australia's critical defence and strategic policy choices as well as encourage and facilitate discussion and debate among the strategy community and Australian public".

ASPI has advocated for the procurement of the Northrop Grumman B-21 Raider by Australia.

In 2020, ASPI issued an apology to a researcher after falsely connecting him to the Thousand Talents Plan and China's defense industry in a report tracking Chinese universities with ties to the Chinese military. Senator Kim Carr criticized the usage of ASPI's report by the Australian Research Council, which led to the naming of 32 academics suspected of Chinese defense research ties by The Australian, in what Carr referred to as a "blacklist", while also noting ASPI's own disclaimer that that the report should not be taken as evidence of wrongdoing. The Australian Research Council admitted that 30 of the 32 academics named were cleared of any national security concerns.

In December 2021, Twitter removed 2,160 accounts linked to Chinese regional and state propaganda campaigns as a result of analysis by ASPI.

Reception
ASPI has been described by ITNews, The Diplomat and Myriam Robin in the Australian Financial Review as being one of Australia's most influential national security policy think tanks.

In February 2020, Australian Labor Party Senator Kim Carr described the ASPI as "hawks intent on fighting a new cold war." Former Foreign Minister Bob Carr (no relation) said the ASPI provides a "one-sided, pro-American view of the world" and criticised the group for taking what he claimed was almost $450,000 from the U.S. State Department, to track Australian universities with Chinese research collaborations, and "vilifying and denigrating Australian researchers and their work." Bob Carr's criticism of ASPI came after ASPI president Peter Jennings had raised questions about the donation of $1.8 million by a Chinese billionaire to a group related to Carr. ASPI replied that it "doesn’t have an editorial line on China, but we have a very clear method for how we go about our research," and claimed that the true amount of State Department funding was less than half that amount stated by Carr. ASPI was criticized by former diplomats John Menadue, Geoff Raby, and Bruce Haigh, with Haigh referring to ASPI as serving the foreign policy interests of the Liberal Party of Australia. In July 2022 an article in The Economist described ASPI as "hawkish".

In October 2018, the Australian Digital Transformation Agency criticised an ASPI report on the Australian Government's digital identity program. The Agency stated that the report "was inaccurate and contained many factual errors", which "demonstrate a clear misunderstanding of how the digital identity system is intended to work". The author of the report responded to the criticism, saying his concerns were acknowledged in private despite being publicly rejected by the agency.In June 2020, ASPI was criticised by Chinese Foreign Ministry spokesman, Zhao Lijian for claiming that the Chinese government was behind cyber attacks against the Australian government and Australian businesses. In response, ASPI executive director Peter Jennings said the ministry's comments were an attempt to distract attention from the think tank's research into the Chinese government.

In November 2020, the Chinese government released a letter containing a list of grievances it had with the Australian government and a threat of economic retaliation. One of the points of contention was "funding 'anti-China' research at the Australian Strategic Policy Institute". The Australian government rejected the contents of the letter.

Writing in Crikey, David Hardaker described the ASPI as a "powerful voice in the policy debate on Australia’s defence strategy". Hardaker wrote that even though ASPI called itself independent, it was "very much a creature of the defence establishment". He stated that since its foundation in 2002, ASPI's funding has increasingly come from the defence industry and foreign governments, and its governing board includes people who work for defence contractors. According to Hardaker, the interconnections between the defence industry and think tanks such as the ASPI "gives weapons manufacturers huge scope to influence the nation’s decision-making on how it deals with China".

References

External links 
 

Australian defence policies
2001 establishments in Australia
Organisations based in Canberra
Foreign policy and strategy think tanks in Australia